Kentucky Route 1848 (KY 1848) is a  state highway in the U.S. state of Kentucky, the route is located entirely in Shelby County and is  long. It connects KY 55 in Finchville to KY 362 in northern Shelby County.

Route description
The route originates at a junction with KY 55 in Finchville and is called Buck Creek Road until it meets US 60 in Simpsonville. From Finchville, the route heads westward until it meets Clark Station Road, where it turns north toward Simpsonville. KY 1848 meets KY 1399 where the Outlet Shoppes of the Bluegrass are located and widens to four-lanes. It then crosses I-64 and narrows to two-lanes north of the interstate. However, plans are to widen the road to four lanes all the way to US 60 to accommodate increased traffic due to growth in Simpsonville.

History
The current route existed by 1942 but was not yet signed. It was officially signed as KY 1848 between 1955 and 1987.

Major intersections

References

1848
1848